Trelew Omega Transmitter (station F) situated at Golfo Nuevo, 40 km outside Trelew, Argentina at  was a grounded 366m high steel guyed mast antenna, which was the tallest construction in South America. It was demolished on June 23, 1998 by explosives.

See also
OMEGA Navigation System

References

External links
 Demolition video
 https://web.archive.org/web/20150530205511/http://www.haikuvalley.com/History/Argentina/21320099_qj5tsP#!i=1697856205&k=8D6rRxD

Towers in Argentina
Towers completed in 1976
Buildings and structures demolished in 1998
1976 establishments in Argentina
1998 disestablishments in Argentina
Buildings and structures demolished by controlled implosion
Demolished buildings and structures in Argentina